Australian marine parks (formerly Commonwealth marine reserves) are marine protected areas located within Australian waters and are managed by the Australian government. These waters generally extend from three nautical miles off the coast to the outer limit of Australia’s Exclusive Economic Zone at 200 nautical miles while marine protected areas located closer in-shore are the responsibility of the states or the Northern Territory.

History
Under the Howard Government the world’s first Oceans Policy was developed. It included the creation of the Great Australian Bight Marine Park in 1998, greatly increased protection of the Great Barrier Reef Marine Park, and in 2007, established a series of large marine parks in Australia's south-east, now collectively known as the South-east Marine Parks Network.

2012 marine parks

In 2012, the Australian government under Labor/Kevin Rudd revealed plans to create the world's largest marine reserve network, made up of five main zones in offshore waters surrounding every state and territory. The number of marine reserves off the Australian coast would increase from 27 to 60 and would cover  of ocean including the entire Coral Sea.

The plans were met with criticism by commercial and recreational fishers, for being too restrictive, and by environment groups for skirting areas of potential oil and gas prospectively, and that just a small amount of the total area completely off-limits fishing.

Suspension and review
In the lead-up to the 2013 Australian federal election, the Liberal–National Coalition opposition led by Tony Abbott pledged to stop the expansion of marine protection parks announced during Labor's tenure. Following the election of the Abbott government in September, the reserves announced in 2012 were re-proclaimed new Commonwealth marine reserves, invalidating the management plans and exclusion zones before they came into effect the following year on July 1, 2014. As such, the suspension left the reserves as "paper parks" with no effective protection measures.

A review into the 40 Commonwealth Marine Reserves that were announced in 2012 began in September 2014. This included the reserves of the South-west, North-west, North, Temperate East and Coral Sea marine regions.

The results of the review were released in September 2016, which recommended zoning changes to 26 of 40 reserves and reductions to the area available to mining, while reducing the impact on commercial fisheries. A later release of draft management plans showed further reductions in no-take zones, including six of the largest marine parks that had the area of their Marine National Park Zones (IUCN II) reduced by between 42% and 73%.

The new management plans for the 40 marine parks came into effect on July 1, 2018, bringing all marine parks under protection.

Renaming
During a period of 2017, feedback was sought for the draft management plans of the 2012 Commonwealth Marine Reserves Review. The consultation process included a proposal to rename Commonwealth marine reserves. On 11 October 2017, the 58 Commonwealth Marine Reserves managed by Parks Australia were renamed as 'Marine Parks'.

Protection zones
Individual marine parks are assigned an IUCN category. However, each marine park may have one or multiple protection zones, each zone has an IUCN protected area category and related rules for managing activities to ensure the protection of marine habitats and species

The following table is a summary of the zoning rules of Australian marine parks:

List of marine parks

The Australian marine parks are managed in groups of reserves called 'networks', except for the Coral Sea Marine Park and the Heard Island and McDonald Islands Marine Reserve.

New parks are in the process of being created around Christmas Island and the Cocos (Keeling) Islands.

Coral Sea Marine Park

Heard Island and McDonald Islands Marine Reserve
The Heard Island and McDonald Islands are located in the southern Indian Ocean, approximately 4,100 kilometres south-west of Perth, Western Australia.

North Network
The North Marine Parks Network contains 8 marine parks covering , located off the coast of the Northern Territory and Queensland.

 Arafura
 Arnhem
 Gulf of Carpentaria
 Joseph Bonaparte Gulf
 Limmen
 Oceanic Shoals
 West Cape York
 Wessel

North-west Network
The North-west Marine Parks Network contains 13 marine parks covering , located off the north-west coast of Western Australia.

 Argo-Rowley Terrace
 Ashmore Reef
 Carnarvon
 Cartier Island
 Dampier
 Eighty Mile Beach
 Gascoyne
 Kimberley
 Mermaid Reef
 Montebello Islands Marine Park
 Ningaloo
 Roebuck Bay
 Shark Bay

Temperate East Network
The Temperate East Marine Parks Network contains 8 marine parks covering , located off the coast of New South Wales.

 Central Eastern
 Cod Grounds
 Gifford
 Hunter
 Jervis
 Lord Howe
 Norfolk
 Solitary Islands

South-east Network
The South-east Marine Parks Network contains 14 marine parks covering , located off the coasts of Victoria, Tasmania and South Australia.

 Apollo
 Beagle
 Boags
 East Gippsland
 Flinders
 Franklin
 Freycinet
 Huon
 Macquarie Island
 Murray
 Nelson
 South Tasman Rise
 Tasman Fracture
 Zeehan

South-west Network
The South-west Network contains 14 marine parks covering , located off the coast of South Australia and Western Australia.

 Abrolhos
 Bremer
 Eastern Recherche Marine Park
 Geographe
 Great Australian Bight
 Jurien
 Murat
 Perth Canyon
 South-west Corner
 Southern Kangaroo Island
 Twilight
 Two Rocks
 Western Eyre
 Western Kangaroo Island

See also
 Protected areas managed by the Australian government

Notes

References

Further reading
 Australian Government Department of the Environment and Energy - Australian marine parks

 
Exclusive economic zone of Australia